Zhu Gui is a fictional character in Water Margin, one of the Four Great Classical Novels in Chinese literature. Nicknamed "Dry Land Alligator", he ranks 92nd among the 108 Stars of Destiny and 56th among the 72 Earthly Fiends.

Background
The novel depicts Zhu Gui as tall with a yellowish beard and cheekbones like fists. Originally a tradesman, he joins the outlaws at Liangshan Marsh led by Wang Lun after losing his investment. Wang puts him in charge of an inn which acts as a lookout for the stronghold.

First appearance
Zhu Gui first appears in the novel when Lin Chong comes to join Liangshan on the recommendation of the nobleman   Chai Jin after killing three men sent to murder him by the Grand Marshal Gao Qiu. It is a snowy night when Lin stops by to eat in Zhu's inn. Miserable over his misfortune, Lin writes a poem on the wall which reveals his identity. Zhu introduces himself to Lin Chong and leads him through the marsh to the stronghold to meet Wang Lun and the other two chiefs Du Qian and Song Wan.

Wang Lun tries to send Lin Chong away with gifts and excuses for fear that the latter, a reputedly good fighter, would usurp his place. But Zhu Gui, Du Qian and Song Wan urge him to accept Lin Chong. Wang by and by allows Lin to stay but keeps him in a low position.

Chao Gai becomes chief of Liangshan
Chao Gai and his six robber partners seek refuge in Liangshan after they are found to be the hijackers of the valuables in transportation to Grand Tutor Cai Jing. Again, Wang Lun fears that Chao and his friends will threaten his position. So he tries to send them away with gifts and excuses. Wu Yong senses Lin Chong's unhappiness with Wang and instigates him to kill the chief. With Wang removed, Chao Gai is elected in his place. He allows Song Wan, Du Qian and Zhu Gui to transfer their allegiance to him.

Saving Li Kui
When Li Kui goes back to his home in Yishui to fetch his mother to Liangshan, Song Jiang is worried that he would get into trouble with his quick temper. So Zhu Gui is sent to keep a tab on Li as Yishui is also his home county. Zhu Gui stays in Zhu Fu's house while in Yishui.

As Song Jiang has expected, Li Kui's reckless nature puts him in harm's way. He exposes his identity after he killed four tigers on the Yi Ridge which had eaten his mother. He had earlier killed a highwayman Li Gui who posed as him, but the man's wife ran away having learnt that he is the famous outlaw Li Kui. When Li Kui is acclaimed as a tiger slayer in the village at the foot of the ridge, Li Gui's wife recognises him and informs one Squire Cao. Li is drugged and tied up.

The magistrate of Yishui, upon receiving Cao's report, sends chief constable Li Yun to lead soldiers to escort Li Kui to his office. Zhu Gui wants to use force to rescue Li Kui, but Zhu Fu proposes a plan. The brothers pretend to give the escort party a send-off treat over their big catch. As Zhu Fu has learnt martial arts from Li Yun, the latter, together with his men, unsuspectingly drinks the spiked wine that he offers. When the group are out cold, the Zhu brothers free Li Kui, who kills all the constables but spares Li Yun as Zhu Fu intervenes. After Li Yun comes to, he catches up with the three and fights Li Kui. Zhu Fu then interposes and emphasises to Li Yun that he has no choice but to join Liangshan. Li Yun accepts his advice.

Campaigns and death
Zhu Gui is put in charge of an inn which acts as a lookout for Liangshan after the 108 Stars of Destiny came together in what is called the Grand Assembly. He participates in the campaigns against the Liao invaders and rebel forces in Song territory following amnesty from Emperor Huizong for Liangshan.

Zhu Gui falls sick after the battle of Hangzhou in the campaign against Fang La and dies before Fang is vanquished. He is conferred the posthumous title "Righteous Gentleman of Integrity".

References
 
 
 
 
 
 
 

72 Earthly Fiends
Fictional characters from Shandong